The 2022–23 FC Rapid București season is the club's 100th season in existence and the second consecutive season in the top flight of Romanian football. In addition to the domestic league, FC Rapid București are participating in this season's edition of the Cupa României.. The season covers the period from 1 July 2022 to 30 June 2023.

Players

First-team squad

Out on loan

Pre-season and friendlies

Competitions

Overview

Liga I

League table

Results summary

Results by round

Matches 
The league fixtures were announced on 1 July 2022.

Cupa României

Group stage

References 

FC Rapid București seasons
Rapid București